This is a list of aircraft manufacturers sorted alphabetically by International Civil Aviation Organization (ICAO)/common name. It contains the ICAO/common name, manufacturers name(s), country and other data, with the known years of operation in parentheses.

The ICAO names are listed in bold. Having an ICAO name does not mean that a manufacturer is still in operation today. Just that some of the aircraft produced by that manufacturer are still flying.

M
M&D Flugzeugbau, Germany
M7 Aerospace, M7 Aerospace – United States, (2002–present)
Macair, Macair Industries Inc – Canada
Macchi, Aeronautica Macchi SpA – Italy, > Aermacchi
Macdonald, MacDonald Aircraft Company – United States
Machen, Machen Inc – United States
Mac Para Technology, Rožnov pod Radhoštěm, Czech Republic
Mad Max Aero, Mad Max Aero – United States
Magni, Magni Gyro di Vittorio Magni – Italy
Makelan, Makelan Corporation – United States
Malmo, AB Malmö Flygindustri – Sweden
MAPO, Federalnoye Gosudarstvennoye Unitarnoye Predpriyatie, Voyenno-Promyshlennyi Kompleks MAPO – Russia
Maranda, Maranda Aircraft Company Ltd – Canada
Marbella Parapente, Málaga, Spain
March, Jones And Cribb, March, Jones & Cribb Ltd. – United Kingdom
Marco, Marco-Elektronik Company – Poland
Marganski, Edward Marganski-Zaklad Remontów i Produkcji Sprzetu Lotniczego – Poland
Marie, Jean-Pierre Marie – France
Marmande, Marmande Aéronautique – France
Marquart, Ed Marquart – United States
Marsh, Marsh Aviation Company – United States
Marshall of Cambridge Aerospace – United Kingdom
Marshall & Sons, Marshall & Sons – United Kingdom
Marske Aircraft Corporation, Marion, Ohio, United States
Martin, Glenn L. Martin Company – United States, (1912–1916, 1917–1961, ?-1996) > Lockheed Martin
Martin-Baker, Martin-Baker Aircraft Company – United Kingdom
Martinsyde, Martinsyde Ltd. – United Kingdom
Maule, Maule Air Inc – United States
Maule, Maule Aircraft Corporation – United States
Maupin, Jim Maupin – United States
Maverick, Maverick Air Inc – United States
Maverick, Maverick Jets Inc – United States
Max Holste, Société des Avions Max Holste – France
Max Holste, Société Nouvelle Max Holste – France
MBB, MBB Helicopter Canada Ltd – Canada, > Eurocopter Canada
MBB, Messerschmitt-Bölkow-Blohm GmbH – Germany, (1969–1989) > DASA
MBB-Kawasaki, see MBB and KAWASAKI – Germany/Japan
Mccarley, Charles E. McCarley – United States
MCC Aviation, Gandvaux, Switzerland
McCulloch – United States
Mcdonnell, McDonnell Aircraft Corporation – United States, (1938–1967) > McDonnell-Douglas
Mcdonnell, McDonnell Company – United States
Mcdonnell Douglas, McDonnell Douglas Corporation – United States, (1967–1997) > Boeing
Mckinnon, McKinnon Enterprises Inc – United States
Mckinnon, McKinnon-Viking Enterprises – Canada
MD Helicopters, MD Helicopters Inc – United States
MDB, MDB Flugtechnik AG – Switzerland
Mead, George Mead – United States
Melbourne, Melbourne Aircraft Corporation Pty Ltd – Australia
Melex, Melex USA Inc – United States
Menschinsky, Menschinsky – Russia
Merckle, Merckle – Germany
Mercury, Mercury Air Group – United States
Meridionali, Elicotteri Meridionali SpA – Italy
Merlin, Merlin Aircraft Inc – United States
""Merrill Aviation & Defense"", United States
""Merrill Aviation & Defense Ranger Division"", United States
Messerschmitt, Messerschmitt AG – Germany, (1938–1959) > FUS
Messerschmitt-Bolkow, Messerschmitt-Bölkow GmbH – Germany, (1968–1969) > MBB
Meteor, Meteor SpA, Costruzione Aeronautiche – Italy
Metropolitan-Vickers, (Metrovick) – United Kingdom
 Mexican Agricultural Aeronautics – see AAMSA
Meyer, George W. Meyer – United States
Meyers, Meyers Aircraft Company – United States
Micco, Micco Aircraft Company – United States
Micro-Craft, Micro-Craft Inc. – United States
Microjet, Microjet SA – France
Microleve, Microleve – Brazil
Microturbo, Microturbo SA – France
Mid-Continent, Mid-Continent Aircraft Corporation – United States
Midwest Aerosport, Midwest Aerosport Inc – United States
Midwest Engineering & Design, Overland Park, Kansas, United States
Mignet, Henri Mignet – France
Mikoyan, Aviatsionnyi Nauchno-Promyshlennyi Kompleks MiG – Russia
Mikoyan, Aviatsionnyi Nauchno-Promyshlennyi Kompleks-ANPK MiG Imeni A. I. Mikoyana – Russia
Mikoyan, Mikoyan OKB – Russia
Mikoyan, Moskovskii Mashinostroitelnyy Zavod Imeni A. I. Mikoyana – Russia
MIL, Mil OKB – Russia
MIL, Moskovsky Vertoletny Zavod Imeni M L Milya OAO – Russia
Miles, F. G. and G. H. Miles – United Kingdom
Miles, F. G. Miles Ltd – United Kingdom
Miles, Miles Aircraft Ltd – United Kingdom
Miller (1), Miller – United States
Miller (2), William Y. Miller – United States
Miller, Merle Miller – United States
Millicer, Millicer Aircraft Industries Pty Ltd – Australia
Mini-Fly GmbH, Kirchardt, Germany
Mini-IMP, Mini-IMP Aircraft Company – United States
Minty, Ted Minty – Australia
Mirage, Mirage Aircraft Inc – United States
Mitchell Aircraft Corporation, Mitchell Aircraft Corporation – United States
Mitchell-Procter, Mitchell-Procter Aircraft Ltd – United Kingdom
Mitsubishi, Mitsubishi Aircraft International Inc – United States, (see Mitsubishi Zero)
Mitsubishi, Mitsubishi Heavy Industries Ltd – Japan
Mitsubishi, Mitsubishi Jukogyo KK – Japan
Mitsubishi, Shin Mitsubishi Jukogyo KK – Japan
Molniya, Nauchno-Proizvodstvennoye Obedinenie Molniya OAO – Russia
Mong, Ralph Mong – United States
Moniot, Avions Philippe Moniot – France
Monnett, John T. Monnett – United States
Monocoupe Aircraft of Florida, Monocoupe Aircraft of Florida Inc – United States
Monocoupe, Monocoupe Aircraft Corporation – United States
Montagne, Montagne Aircraft LLC – United States
Montana, Montana Coyote Inc – United States
Moog, Moog Incorporated – United States
Mooney, Al W. Mooney – United States
Mooney, Mooney Aircraft Corporation – United States
Mooney, Mooney Aircraft Inc – United States
Morane-Saulnier, Gérance des Etablissements Morane-Saulnier – France
Morane-Saulnier, Société Anonyme des Aéroplanes Morane-Saulnier – France
Morane-Saulnier, Société d'Exploitation des Etablissements Morane-Saulnier – France
Morane-Saulnier, Société Morane-Saulnier – France
Moravan, Moravan AS – Czech Republic
Moravan, Moravan Národní Podnik – Czechoslovakia
Morrisey, Bill Morrisey – United States
Morrisey, Morrisey Aircraft Corporation – United States
Morrisey, Morrisey Aviation Inc – United States
Morrisey, The Morrisey Company – United States
Morse, George Morse Jr – United States
Moss Brothers Aircraft – United Kingdom
Moth Aircraft, Moth Aircraft Corporation – United States
Moyes Delta Gliders, Botany, New South Wales, Australia
Moyes Microlights, Botany, New South Wales, Australia
MPB AEROSPACE S.L., MPB Aerospace S.L. – Spain
Moura, Mauricio Impelizieri P. Moura – Brazil
Mraz, Tovarna Letadel Inz. J. Mráz – Czech Republic
MS Parafly, Meßstetten, Germany
MSW, MSW Aviation – Switzerland
Mudry, Avions Mudry & Cie – France
Mureaux – see ANF Les Mureaux
Murphy, Murphy Aircraft Manufacturing Ltd – Canada
Murphy, Murphy Aviation Ltd – Canada
Murrayair, Murrayair Ltd – United States
Mustang, Mustang Aeronautics Inc – United States
Mven, Mven OOO – Russia
Myasishchev, Eksperimentalnyi Mashinostroitelnyi Zavod Imeni V M Myasishcheva – Russia
Myasishchev, Myasishchev OKB – Russia
Mylius, Leichtflugzeuge-Entwicklungen Dipl. Ing. Hermann Mylius – Germany
Mylius, Mylius Flugzeugwerk GmbH & Co KG – Germany

N
Naglo, Naglo Boots-Werft – Germany
NAGL System, Weißkirchen in Steiermark, Austria
NAI, Nanjing Aeronautical Institute – China
Nakajima, Nakajima Aircraft Company – Japan
National Aerospace Laboratories, National Aeronautical Laboratory – India
NAMC (1), Nihon Aeroplane Manufacturing Company Ltd – Japan
NAMC (1), Nihon Kokuki Seizo KK – Japan
Nanchang, Nanchang Aircraft Manufacturing Company – China
Nanjing, Nanjing Light Aircraft Company – China
Nanjing University, Nanjing University of Aeronautics and Astronautics – China
Nardi, Nardi Costruzioni Aeronautiche SpA – Italy
Nash, Nash Aircraft Ltd – United Kingdom
National Aeronautics, National Aeronautics Company – United States
National Aircraft Factory No. 2 Stockport United Kingdom
National Steel, National Steel Corporation Ltd – Canada
Naval Aircraft Factory, Naval Aircraft Factory – United States
Naval Air Establishment, Naval Air Establishment – China
Nervures, Soulom, France
NIMBUS Srl, NIMBUS Srl – Italy
Navion, Navion Aircraft Company – United States
Navion, Navion Aircraft Corporation – United States
Navion, Navion Rangemaster Aircraft Corporation – United States
NDN, NDN Aircraft Ltd – United Kingdom
Neico, Neico Aviation Inc – United States
NEIVA, Industria Aeronáutica Neiva SA – Brazil
NEIVA, Sociedade Construtora Aeronáutica Neiva Ltda – Brazil
Nesmith, Robert E. Nesmith – United States
Netherland Army Aircraft Factory, Netherland Army Aircraft Factory – Netherlands
NeuraJet, Senftenbach, Austria
New Glasair, New Glasair LLC – United States
New Glasair, New GlaStar LLC – United States
New Meyers, The New Meyers Aircraft Company – United States
New PowerChutes, Alberton, Gauteng, South Africa
New Standard, New Standard Aircraft Company – United States
New Zealand, New Zealand Aerospace Industries Ltd – New Zealand
NHI, NH Industries SARL – France/Germany/Italy
Nicollier, Henri Nicollier – France
Nieuport, Societe Anonyme des Etablissements Nieuport – France > Nieuport-Astra
Nieuport-Astra – France > Nieuport-Delage
Nieuport-Delage – France > Loire-Nieuport
Nieuport-Macchi – Italy > Macchi
Nieuport & General/British Nieuport (1916–1920) – United Kingdom
Nipper, Nipper Aircraft Ltd – United Kingdom
Nipper, Nipper Kits and Components Ltd – United Kingdom
Nitsche, LTB Gerhard Nitsche – Germany
Nitsche, Nitsche Flugzeugbau GmbH – Germany
Noin, Noin Aéronautique – France
Noorduyn, Noorduyn Aviation Ltd – Canada
Noorduyn, Noorduyn Norseman Aircraft Ltd – Canada
Nord, Nord-Aviation, Société Nationale de Constructions Aéronautiques – France, (?-1970) > Aérospatiale
Nord, Société Nationale de Constructions Aéronautiques du Nord – France
Nordic Aircraft AS, Kinsarvik, Norway
Nordflug, Flugzeugbau Nord GmbH – Germany
Norman, Norman Aviation – Canada
Normand Dube, Aviation Normand Dubé Inc – Canada
North American, North American Aviation Inc – United States, (1928–1966) > Rockwell
North American Rockwell, North American Rockwell Corporation – United States
North American Rotorwerks, Tukwila, Washington, United States
Northern, Northern Aircraft Inc – United States, (?-1959) > Downer
Northrop, Northrop Aircraft Inc – United States, (1926–1994)
Northrop, Northrop Corporation – United States
Northrop Grumman, Northrop Grumman Corporation – United States, (1994–present)
Nostalgair, Nostalgair Inc – United States
NST-Machinenbau, Werther, North Rhine-Westphalia, Germany
Nuri Demirag, Nuri Demirag – Turkey
Nusantara, PT Industri Pesawat Terbang Nusantara – Indonesia
Nuventure, NuVenture Aircraft – United States
Nuwaco, NuWaco Aircraft Company Inc – United States
NZAI, New Zealand Aerospace Industries – New Zealand

O
Oakland, Oakland Airmotive Company – United States
Oberlerchner, Josef Oberlerchner Holzindustrie – Austria
Octans Aircraft - Brazil
Offpiste Limited, Dursley, Gloucestershire, United Kingdom
OGMA, Indústria Aeronáutica de Portugal – Portugal
Oldfield, Andrew Oldfield – United States
Oldfield, Barney Oldfield Aircraft Company – United States
Olympic Ultralights, Olympic Ultralights LLC – United States
OMAC, OMAC Inc – United States
OMF, Ostmecklenburgische Flugzeugbau GmbH – Germany
OneAircraft, Celje, Slovenia
One Aviation - Albuquerque, New Mexico, United States
Omni, Omni Titan Corporation – United States
Omni-Weld, Omni-Weld Inc – United States
On Mark, On Mark Engineering Company – United States
O'neill, O'Neill Airplane Company – United States
Optica, Optica Industries Ltd – United Kingdom
Option Air, Option Air Reno – United States
Orel Aircraft, Selles-Saint-Denis, France
Orlican, Orlican Národní Podnik – Czech Republic
Oskbes-Mai, Otraslevoe Spetsialnoe Konstruktorskoe Byuro Eksperimentalnogo Samolyotostroeniya-Moskovskogo Aviatsionnogo Instituta – Russia
Osprey, Osprey Aircraft – United States
Österreichische-Ungarische Albatros Flugzeug Werke, Österreichische-Ungarische Albatros Flugzeug Werke – Austro-Hungarian Empire, (1914–1917) > Phoenix Flugzeugwerke
Ottawa Car Manufacturing, Ottawa Car Manufacturing – Canada, (Ottawa Car Company, The Ottawa Car and Aircraft Company)
Ozone Gliders, Le Bar-sur-Loup, France

P
PacAero, PacAero Engineering Corporation – United States
PACI, Philippine Aircraft Company Inc – Philippines
Pacific Aero, Pacific Aero-Products Co. – United States, (1916–1917) > Boeing
Pacific Aerospace, Pacific Aerospace Corporation Ltd – New Zealand
Pacific Airmotive, Pacific Airmotive Corporation – United States
PADC, Philippine Aerospace Development Corporation – Philippines
PAI, Pacific Aeronautical Inc – Philippines
PAC, Pakistan Aeronautical Complex – Pakistan
Palladium Autocars, Palladium Autocars Ltd. – United Kingdom, (1911–1925)
Panavia, Panavia Aircraft GmbH – Germany/United Kingdom/Italy
Pander & Son, Nederlandse Fabriek van Vliegtuigen H. Pander & Zonen – Netherlands
Panha, Panha – Iran, (Iran Helicopter Support and Renewal Company)
Panzl, Greg Panzl – United States
Papa 51, Papa 51 Ltd – United States
Paraavis, Moscow, Russia
Paradelta Parma, Parma, Italy
Paradise Aircraft, Paradise Industria Aeronautica Ltda, Feira de Santana, Brazil
Paramania LLC, London, UK
Paramotor Inc., Oyster Bay, New York, United States
Paramotor Napedy Paralotniowe, Warsaw, Poland
Paramotor Performance, Bandhagen, Sweden
Paramount, Paramount Aircraft Corporation – United States
Paraplane International, Medford, New Jersey, United States
Parapower, Pilchowo, Poland
Parascender Technologies Inc., Kissimmee, Florida, United States
Parasport.de, Schwanewede, Germany
Paratech, Paratech AG, Appenzell, Switzerland
Paratour, Saint-Chrysostome, Quebec, Canada
Paratrek, Auburn, California, United States
Parker, Cal Y. Parker – United States
Parnall, George Parnall & Company Ltd – United Kingdom
Parrish Aircraft Xperimental Inc, Plantation, Florida, United States
Partenair, Partenair Design Inc – Canada
Partenavia, Partenavia Costruzione Aeronautiche SpA – Italy
Pasotti, Legnami Pasotti SpA – Italy
Paulista, Companhia Aeronáutica Paulista – Brazil
Pawnee Aviation, Pawnee Aviation, Inc., Longmont, Colorado, and later McCook, Nebraska, United States
Paxman's, Paxman's Northern Lite Aerocraft Inc – Canada
Payne, Vernon W. Payne – United States
Pazmany, Ladislao Pazmany – United States
Pazmany, Pazmany Aircraft Corporation – United States
PCV, Pregiate Costruzioni Volanti – Italy
Pegas 2000, Prague, Czech Republic
Pegase Aero, Pegase Aero Enr – Canada
Pelegrin Limited, Adazi, Latvia
 Pemberton-Billing Ltd, England (1913–1916) > Supermarine Aviation Works Ltd.
Pena, Louis Pena – France
Pennec-Lucas, Serge Pennec & Paul Lucas – France
Percival, Percival Aircraft Ltd – United Kingdom
Peregrine, Peregrine Flight International – United States
Pereira, George Pereira – United States
Performance Aircraft, Olathe, Kansas, United States
Personal Flight, Chelan, Washington, United States
Pfalz, Pfalz Flugzeug-werke GmbH – Germany
Phillips, Peter J. C. Phillips – United Kingdom
Phillips & Powis, Phillips & Powis Aircraft (Reading) Ltd – United Kingdom
Phillips & Powis, Phillips & Powis Aircraft Ltd – United Kingdom
Phoenix, Phoenix Aircraft Ltd – United Kingdom
Phoenix-Aviacor, Phoenix OKB, Aviakor Mezhdunarodnaya Aviatsionnaya Korporatsiya OAO – Russia
Phoenix Flugzeugwerke, Phoenix Flugzeugwerke – Austro-Hungarian Empire, (1917–?)
Phoenix Gleitschirmantriebe, Würselen, Germany
Phoenix Industries, Inc., Southampton, New Jersey, United States
Phönix, Phönix – Austro-Hungarian Empire, (1914–1919)
Piaggio, Industrie Aeronautiche e Meccaniche Rinaldo Piaggio SpA – Italy
Piaggio, Piaggio & Companie SpA – Italy
Piaggio, Piaggio Aero Industries SpA – Italy
Piaggio-Douglas, see PIAGGIO and DOUGLAS – Italy/United States
Piasecki, Piasecki Helicopter Corporation – United States
Piel, Avions Claude Piel – France
Piel, Claude Piel – France
Piel, Etablissements Claude Piel – France
Piel, Piel Aviation SA – France
Pietenpol, Bernard H. Pietenpol – United States
PIK, Polyteknikkojen Ilmailukerho – Finland
Pilatus, Pilatus Flugzeugwerke AG – Switzerland
Pilatus Britten-Norman, Pilatus Britten-Norman Ltd – United Kingdom, (PBN)
Pilots Right Stuff, Brannenburg, Germany
Piper, Piper Aircraft Corporation – United States
Pipistrel d.o.o. – Slovenia
Pitcairn, Pitcairn Aircraft, Inc. – United States
Pitcairn-Cierva, Pitcairn-Cierva Autogiro Company – United States, (1929–?)
Pitts, Curtis Pitts – United States
Pitts, Pitts Aerobatics – United States
Pitts, Pitts Aviation Enterprises – United States
Plage & Laskiewicz, Zaklady Mechaniczne A. Plage i T. Laskiewicz – Poland, (1920–1935) (Mechanical Works A. Plage & T. Laskiewicz) > LWS
Plan, Max Plan – France
Plumb, Plumb – United States
Pober, Paul H. Poberezny – United States
Podesva, Peter Podesva – Czech Republic
Podesva, Tomás Podesva – Czech Republic
Polikarpov, Polikarpov OKB – Russia
Politechnika Warszawska, Politechnika Warszawska – Poland
Pop's Props, Cooksville, Illinois, United States
Porterfield, Porterfield Aircraft Corporation – United States
Portsmouth Aviation, Portsmouth Aviation Ltd, United Kingdom
Potez, Etablissements Henry Potez SARL – France
Potez, Société des Avions et Moteurs Henry Potez – France
Potez Air-Fouga, Potez Air-Fouga – France
Pottier, Avions Pottier – France
Pottier, Jean Pottier – France
Powell, John C. Powell – United States
Practavia, Practavia Ltd – United Kingdom
Prescott, Prescott Aeronautical Corporation – United States
Private Explorer, Private Explorer Inc – United States
Privateer Industries, Florida, United States
Procaer, Progetti Costruzioni Aeronautiche SpA – Italy
Pro-Design, Natters, Austria
Professional Aviation, Professional Aviation Services (Pty) Ltd – South Africa
Progressive Aerodyne, Progressive Aerodyne Inc – United States
Promavia, Promavia SA – Belgium
Protech, ProTech Aircraft Inc – United States
Pro Sport Aviation, Wingate, North Carolina, United States
Prowler, Prowler Aviation Inc – United States
Pulsar, Pulsar Aircraft Corporation – El Salvador-United States
Putzer, Alfons Pützer KG – Germany
PWS, Podlaska Wytwórnia Lotnicza – Poland, (WSK-PZL) (Panstowe Zaklady Lotnicze)
PZL-Mielec, Polskie Zaklady Lotnicze Sp z oo – Poland
PZL-Mielec, Wytwórnia Sprzetu Komunikacyjnego-Panstwowe Zaklady Lotnicze Mielec – Poland, (Wytwornia Sprzetu Komunikacyjnego – Transport Equipment Manufacturing Centre)
PZL-Mielec, Wytwórnia Sprzetu Komunikacyjnego-Panstwowe Zaklady Lotnicze Mielec SA – Poland
PZL-Okecie, Centrum Naukowo-Produkcyjne Samolotow Lekkich-Panstwowe Zaklady Lotnicze Warszawa – Poland
PZL-Okecie, EADS PZL Warszawa-Okecie SA – Poland
PZL-Okecie, Panstwowe Zaklady Lotnicze Warszawa-Okecie – Poland
PZL-Okecie, Panstwowe Zaklady Lotnicze Warszawa-Okecie SA – Poland
PZL-Okecie, Wytwórnia Sprzetu Komunikacyjnego-Panstwowe Zaklady Lotnicze Okecie – Poland
PZL-Okecie, Wytwórnia Sprzetu Komunikacyjnego-Panstwowe Zaklady Lotnicze Warszawa-Okecie – Poland
PZL-Swidnik, Wytwórnia Sprzetu Komunikacyjnego Im. Zygmunta Pulawskiego-Panstwowe Zaklady Lotnicze Swidnik – Poland
PZL-Swidnik, Wytwórnia Sprzetu Komunikacyjnego-Panstwowe Zaklady Lotnicze Swidnik – Poland
PZL-Swidnik, Zygmunta Pulawskiego-Panstwowe Zaklady Lotnicze Swidnik SA – Poland

See also
 Aircraft
 List of aircraft engine manufacturers
 List of aircraft manufacturers

M